Rāhula was the son of Siddhārtha Gautama (commonly known as the Buddha).

Rahula may also refer to:
Rahula, Estonia, a village in  Harju County, Estonia
Rahula College, a boys' school in Sri Lanka
Sri Rahula College, a school at Katugastota, Kandy in Sri Lanka
Rahula (snail), a genus of snails in the family Ariophantidae

People with the surname
Barys Rahula (1920–2005), Belarusian political activist
Ven. Vanavasi Rahula Thero, Sri Lankan Buddhist monk and the founder of Jathika Namal Uyana